

Soils of the United States

The US soil taxonomic hierarchy includes orders, suborders, great groups, subgroups, families and series, with each series representing a unique kind of soil.  In the United States, over 19,000 soil series have been identified.  
The percentages of land area (in the US and associated territories, etc.) occupied by soils of the twelve orders have been estimated as:

Alfisols and Inceptisols occur widely in the US, but the circumstances of their occurrence would be difficult to characterize briefly.  The Alfisols have a subsurface ("B") horizon characterized by phyllosilicate clay accumulation (suggesting illuviation of such clay from above).  The Inceptisols have a weakly developed B horizon as a consequence of weathering and/or other processes.

Andisols are found in areas where soils have formed in certain kinds of volcanic ejecta (usually pumice and/or volcanic ash).

Aridisols occur in parts of the western United States which are too dry for the growth of mesophytic plants.

Entisols, which exhibit little soil profile development, are characteristic of areas where soil parent materials have quite recently been deposited, e.g. on recent river alluvium.

In the US, Gelisols occur only in parts of Alaska; they are characterized by having permafrost within 100 cm of the surface.

Histosols are organic soils lacking permafrost within 100 cm of the surface; they are characteristically formed on wet sites, e.g. bogs, some fens and some muskeg areas.  Some Histosols have been drained, especially to permit cultivation.

In the US, Mollisols occur mostly on the Great Plains, and in some areas of the west.  There is a considerable variety of Mollisols, including soils very closely resembling the Chernozem ("black earth") of eastern Europe (parts of Russia, the Ukraine and neighboring regions), and the Chernozemic soils of the Canadian prairies.

Oxisols occur only in tropical environments, which have very limited extent in the US.

Spodosols often occur under coniferous forest in cool, moist climates, such as southeastern Alaska, the Great Lakes region, the northeastern states, and higher elevations of the northwestern states. Spodosols are also found in warm, moist environments such as Florida and in fact are the most prominent soil order of the state. Spodosols have a B horizon containing a relatively high concentration of illuviated aluminum with accompanying illuviated organic matter, and in many cases, illuviated iron.  Such horizons form under certain acidic leaching conditions influenced by acid decomposition products of litter accumulations under certain tree and/or shrub species.  The Spodosols correspond to the Podzols of Russia, Central Europe and Northern Europe and to the Podzolic soils found in much of Canada's boreal forest.)

Ultisols are rather extensive in warm, humid regions of the US.  They tend to represent rather advanced soil development, and thus are found on relatively old land surfaces.

Vertisols are not extensive in the US, being confined to areas where there is a great abundance of swelling clays, e.g. montmorillonite, that cause churning of soils as a consequence of  wetting and drying cycles.

Factors Contributing to Soil Diversity

Soils are the product of climate, organisms and topography, acting on parent (geologic) material over time.  Thus the great diversity of geologic materials, geomorphic processes, climatic conditions, biotic assemblages and land surface ages in the United States is responsible for the presence of an enormous variety of mineral and organic soils.  (Most of the mineral soils contain significant quantities of organic matter, but not enough to qualify for classification as organic soils.)  The inorganic particles of different mineral soils vary greatly in size distribution,  often as a result of transport and deposition of the parent material from which the soil is formed.  Examples include loess (wind-deposited silt), dune sands, alluvial (river-deposited) sands and silts, and glacial till (which may include substantial amounts of clay, silt, sand, gravel and larger particles).  Compared with sands (0.05 to 2 mm in diameter), silts (0.002 to 0.05 mm in diameter) have a very much larger specific surface (i.e. particle surface area per unit mass).  At the surface of a particle, weathering processes occur.  If the particle contains potential plant nutrients in mineral form, such processes result in the release of the nutrients in readily available, ionic form.  Thus, a high specific surface is a major reason why silty soils tend to be relatively fertile.  Clay particles are finer than silt, being less than 0.002 mm in diameter.  Water retention tends to be greater in the finer-textured soils.  If a fine-textured soil is well aggregated (with aggregates consisting of numerous organic and inorganic particles bonded together), the large pores between aggregates will facilitate drainage and aeration.  (In contrast, drainage and aeration can be poor in poorly aggregated fine-textured soils in which nearly all of the pore space consists of fine pores.)  Drainage is usually good and trafficability is usually superior in the coarser-textured soils.  While some of the clay in a soil may have been inherited in the parent material, older soils might contain a significant amount of clay formed by weathering processes during soil formation.  Soils with a high concentration of clay and organic matter tend to have considerable net negative electrical charge, conferring the ability to retain many plant nutrient cations (e.g. Ca2+, Mg2+, K+, NH4+), readily available to plants by ion exchange.   Plant nutrients are also released from soil organic matter by decomposition, and organic matter is particularly significant as the major form in which soil nitrogen is stored.  Organic matter contributes to aggregation and water-retention properties of soil.  Soil chemical composition reflects not only the original geologic materials (e.g. limestone, granite, basalt), but also soil-forming processes since deposition.  In much of the northern US, soil formation commenced either shortly after glacial retreat at the end of the last Ice Age or even more recently. Elsewhere in the US, one may find some older land surfaces where soil formation has occurred over a much longer period, in addition to some young soils. There are 12 soils in the U.S.

Soil Contamination and Remediation

The United States, although having many sites with contaminated soils, has been a leader in defining and implementing standards for cleanup. Each year thousands of sites complete soil contamination cleanup, some by using microbes that “eat up” toxic chemicals in soil, many others by simple excavation and others by soil vapor extraction, air stripping, or solvent extraction, with the choice of method influenced by the nature of the contaminants involved as well as by costs and extent of the contamination.  In 1980 the U.S.Superfund/CERCLA established strict rules on legal liability for soil contamination. Not only did CERCLA stimulate identification and cleanup of thousands of sites, but it stimulated property buyers and sellers to consider soil contamination and its implications when property transfers occur.

See also
List of U.S. state soils
USDA soil taxonomy
List of Superfund sites in the United States
Agriculture in the United States

References

External links
USDA Natural Resources Conservation Service - soils website
United States Consortium of Soil Science Associations
Soil Science Society of America